Hay Niños Aquí is an album by the Costa Rican band Malpaís. It was released in 2010 by the Costa Rican music label Papaya Records.

Track listing

"Hay Niños Aquí" - 3:55
"El Barrio de los Jazmines" - 4:21
"Los Cuentos de María Rosa" - 3:57
"La Niña que Vino el Futuro" - 3:58
"Soy lo que Soy (intro)" - 2:14
"El Maravilloso" - 3:39
"Río Grande" - 3:55
"Canción del Capitán" - 4:08
"Barrilete" - 2:40
"Soy lo que Soy (continuación)" - 1:42
"La Calle de la Lluvia" - 5:39
"Despertate Guila" - 4:16

2010 albums
Malpaís (group) albums